Yvon Le Roux (born 19 April 1960 in Plouvorn, Finistère) is a French former professional footballer who played as a defender. He earned 28 international caps (one goal) for the France national team during the mid-1980s and was part of the team at the 1986 FIFA World Cup and the team that won the 1984 UEFA European Football Championship. Whilst at Marseille he helped them to the league and cup double in 1989.

International career
Le Roux was a member of the France national team. In the UEFA Euro 1984 Final he was sent off, but his team still managed to beat Spain 2-0.

Honours
Monaco
Coupe de France: 1984–85

Marseille
Division 1: 1988–89
Coupe de France: 1988–89

France
 UEFA European Football Championship: 1984
 Artemio Franchi Cup: 1985

References

External links
  French Football Federation Profile

1960 births
Living people
Sportspeople from Finistère
French footballers
Footballers from Brittany
Association football defenders
France international footballers
UEFA European Championship-winning players
UEFA Euro 1984 players
1986 FIFA World Cup players
Ligue 1 players
Stade Brestois 29 players
AS Monaco FC players
FC Nantes players
Olympique de Marseille players
Paris Saint-Germain F.C. players
French football managers
Stade Brestois 29 managers